Anthony Evans (6 December 1942 – 19 August 2016) was a South African cricketer. He played fifteen first-class matches for Orange Free State between 1968 and 1971.

References

External links
 

1942 births
2016 deaths
South African cricketers
Free State cricketers
Cricketers from Durban